Mikyo

Mikyö Dorje, eighth Gyalwa Karmapa, head of the Kagyu School of Tibetan Buddhism
An alternate transliteration of Miko